Roland Thornqvist (born March 3, 1970) is a Swedish-born American college tennis coach and former college tennis player.  Thornqvist is the current head coach of the Florida Gators women's tennis team of the University of Florida.  He is best known for leading the Florida Gators to National Collegiate Athletic Association (NCAA) Division I national championships in 2003, 2011, 2012, and 2017.

Early years 

Thornqvist was born in Stockholm, Sweden, in 1970.

College career 

Thornqvist attended the University of North Carolina in Chapel Hill, North Carolina, where he played for the North Carolina Tar Heels men's tennis team from 1990 to 1993.  He was recognized as a three-time first-team All-Atlantic Coast Conference (ACC) selection in 1991, 1992 and 1993, and a first-team All-American in 1993.  Thornqvist graduated from North Carolina with a bachelor's degree in economics in 1996.

Coaching career 

Thornqvist was the head coach of the Kansas Jayhawks women's tennis team at the University of Kansas in Lawrence, Kansas in 1997 and 1998.  From 1999 to 2001, he was the head coach of the North Carolina Tar Heels women's tennis team at his alma mater, the University of North Carolina.

In 2002, Thornqvist became the head coach of the Florida Gators women's tennis program at the University of Florida in Gainesville, Florida.  Since then, Thornqvist has been one of the top college tennis coaches in the country. His teams have qualified for the NCAA Tournament every year since he has been the head coach of the Gators.  In 2003, 2011, 2012 and 2017, the Gators women's tennis team won the NCAA Division I National Championship.  Thornqvist's Gators have also finished second in the NCAA tournament in 2002 and 2010.

The Intercollegiate Tennis Association (ITA) named Thornqvist as its national Coach of the Year in 2011.

Coaching record

See also 

 Bryan Shelton
 Florida Gators
 History of the University of Florida
 List of Florida Gators tennis players
 List of University of North Carolina alumni
 University Athletic Association

References

External links 

 Roland Thornqvist – Official biography at FloridaGators.com
 
 

1970 births
Living people
Florida Gators women's tennis coaches
Tennis players from Stockholm
North Carolina Tar Heels men's tennis players
North Carolina Tar Heels men's tennis coaches
Swedish expatriate sportspeople in the United States
Swedish male tennis players